Trap Ye: Season 2 is the second mixtape released by record producer and rapper Southside. The 20-track project has production from the 808 Mafia and features from rappers, G Herbo, Playboi Carti, and Bookie T. The mixtape was dropped on Southside's 29th birthday.

Background
Trap Ye: Season 2 is the sequel to its first mixtape Trap Ye.

Critical reception
DatPiff gave the mixtape a 4.5 star rating out of 5. The popular hip-hop website HotNewHipHop gave the mixtape a 4.4 out of 5 star rating.

Track listing

References

2018 mixtape albums
Southside (record producer) albums
Albums produced by Cubeatz
Albums produced by Jake One
Albums produced by Southside (record producer)
Albums produced by WondaGurl